Mala Vas is a village in the Municipality of Dobrepolje in Slovenia. It lies just east of Videm and its territory extends eastwards to the peak of Mala Vas Hill (596 m). The area is part of the historical region of Lower Carniola. The municipality is now included in the Central Slovenia Statistical Region.

Mass grave
Mala Vas is the site of a mass grave from the period immediately after the Second World War. The Mala Vas Mass Grave is located in a sinkhole in the woods west of the village, marked by a wooden cross. It contains the remains of eight civilians from the village of Podgora murdered on the night of 16 June 1945.

References

External links
Mala Vas at Geopedia

Populated places in the Municipality of Dobrepolje